The Pacheedaht First Nation is a First Nations band government based on the west coast of Vancouver Island in British Columbia, Canada.  Although the Pacheedaht people are Nuu-chah-nulth-aht by culture and language, they are not a member of the Nuu-chah-nulth Tribal Council and define themselves differently.

The government has 4 reserve lands for a total of approximately 180 hectares: Pacheena #1, Gordon River #2, Cullite #3, Queesidaquah #4.

See also

Nuu-chah-nulth
Nuu-chah-nulth language
Makah

References

External links
Nuu-chah-nulth Tribal Council homepage

Nuu-chah-nulth governments
West Coast of Vancouver Island